Andrusov is a surname. Notable people with the surname include:

Dimitrij Andrusov (1897–1976), Slovak geologist
Nicolai Ivanovich Andrusov (1861–1924), Russian geologist, stratigrapher, and paleontologist
Dorsa Andrusov, a wrinkle ridge system on the Moon